Passani  is a village located 33 km south of Peshawar, Khyber Pakhtunkhwa, Pakistan.

Education

The village has three primary schools: one for boys and two for girls, a middle school for boys, and a high school for girls. The literacy rate is 80% for men and 50% for women.

Economy 
The main professions of the people are farming, government jobs and small businesses. Likewise, Passani is a business hub for the surrounding areas of Adezai, Sherkera, Kandao, Hasankhel, Janakod, Bora, Pastawone, Aratbaba, Yarankhel, and Miaghadi.

References

Populated places in Peshawar District